Andorra sent a delegation to compete at the 2010 Winter Paralympics, in Vancouver. It fielded two athletes, both in alpine skiing.

Alpine skiing 

The following two athletes represented Andorra in alpine skiing:

See also
Andorra at the 2010 Winter Olympics
Andorra at the Paralympics

References

External links
Vancouver 2010 Paralympic Games official website
International Paralympic Committee official website

Nations at the 2010 Winter Paralympics
2010
Paralympics